Team Galaxy ( or  in Quebec) is an animated series co-produced by Marathon Media, Image Entertainment Corporation, France 3, Rai Fiction and Jetix Europe in association with YTV. It blends 2D animation with CG elements, and is set at "Galaxy High" (not to be confused with the school in the 1980s animated series of the same name), where a trio of young students try to balance their regular teenage lives and their training to become Space Marshals. The concept and animation style is similar to that of both Totally Spies! and Martin Mystery, other series created by Marathon Media.

Team Galaxy is co-produced by a number of international broadcasters, such as France 3 which was the first to begin airing the full series from 28 August 2006. In the United States, Cartoon Network paid Marathon about $16–$17 million for 52 episodes, for a premiere in fall 2006. It also appears on Canada's YTV and CITV/Jetix in the UK.

Plot
"Team Galaxy" is about a group of friends who try to balance both their school work and their free time. The three protagonists, Yoko, Josh, and Brett, are among the students of a school called "Galaxy High", a galactic justice authority, which defends the galaxy against criminals. The school teaches subjects suitable for these types of missions, which their students endure. The series apparently takes place during the present day, but in an episode where they go through a time skip, a calendar says that the year is 2051, hinting that the actual series takes place in 2050.

Since the final 3 episodes of season 2 of Team Galaxy 'Predator Plants from Outer Space', a new plot has been introduced where Omni, an android as well as a student of another space school, is searching for his fellow schoolmates after his school has been destroyed by an alien bounty hunter named Gangus. He is convinced to stay at Galaxy High for the time being and is promised by Josh, Brett, Yoko, and the rest of GH to help him. Unfortunately, due to the show currently ending at 52 episodes, this plot hasn't been addressed any further.

Characters

Students
 Yoko (Kiko in the French dub): A 15-year-old karaoke-loving wannabe pop singer (who can't carry a tune) and amazingly creative artist who sees Galaxy High as just a step on her way to stardom. Her main weapon is her sonic blaster. Yoko's terrible singing is a running gag in the show, and despite how bad it is, she wins many interstellar competitions with it (aliens think her voice is music while Josh and Brett start crying in pain.) Often, Yoko is distracted on missions when a talent competition or something that could boost her career pops up. She is also a fashion wizard who is always conscious of her looks and style. Her desire for stardom and fame often lead to her capture or place the group in danger. She has a crush on Seth. Her suit as a space marshal is light purple. She is in the same team as Josh and Brett.
 Josh Kirkpatrick: Josh is the rebellious 17-year-old adrenaline junkie, who prefers space training to classroom theory. He mostly fails his classes but succeeds on his missions. He was afraid of water after a childhood incident involving losing his swimming trunks, but has since overcome it after facing it head-on. But for all his wild stunts, Josh's independent thinking is a perfect fit for the team. Although he has repeatedly said he wants to be out of GH, he has never really meant it. His father is the GH's principal, Principal Kirkpatrick. His suit as a space marshal is dark blue. He is in the same team as Brett and Yoko. He is voiced by Emmanuel Garijo in French version and Kirby Morrow in English version.
 Brett: Brett is the 10-year-old headstrong genius, who despite his brilliance feels restricted by his young age. He hates to be called a "kid". He uses his own personal computer to control the hornet, to analyze DNA, and to use Gluefoam. Despite his young age, Brett takes missions more seriously than Yoko and Josh, and often scoffs when they shirk their mission. He is the most sensible of the group, but due to his youth and fun-loving partners, he is often ignored. Josh often uses him to do his own homework or for other selfish reasons. His suit as a space marshal is red. He is in the same team as Josh and Yoko. He is voiced by Fily Keita in French version and Tabitha St. Germain in English version.
 Bobby Von Poppin: One of Yoko and Josh's rivals from Galaxy High. He is by far the most competitive student, and with his high grades and sharp skills (and big ego), he isn't shy about telling everyone who's the top gun on campus. His suit as a space marshal is purple. He is in the same team as Toby and Kimball. He is voiced by Donald Reignoux in French version and Sam Vincent in English version.
 Toby McMaster: Always out to prove that she is the toughest student on campus, Josh describes her as the cutest and most popular girl in school. She always has to be the center of attention, which annoys Yoko.  Her suit as a space marshal is yellow. She is in the same team as Bobby and Kimball.
Princess Kimball: Kimball is a princess. Her privileged upbringing has made her a bit naive and oblivious about the other students. Much like her friend Toby, her suit as a space marshal is yellow. She is in the same team as Bobby and Toby. She is voiced by Fily Keita in French version.
 Spavid: Spavid is one of the few alien students at Galaxy High. He is well liked by all in spite of his general clumsiness. After growing into adulthood, he developed superhuman powers and enhanced reflexes but chose to suppress them after he let them get to his head. His suit as a space marshal is purple. He is in the same team as Ryan (Orion) and Andi (Andromeda). He is voiced by Donald Reignoux in French version and Sam Vincent in English version.
 Orion and Andromeda: They are also known as twin brother and sister, Ryan and Andi. They are from outer space, but on Earth they are known as "global citizens". Ryan's suit as a space marshal is presumably purple, meanwhile Andi's suit as a space marshal is presumably yellow, like other typical space marshalls. They are both Spavid's teammates.
 Seth: A talented musician and Yoko's love interest. He once seemed to be cold and to have no interest in Yoko, but it turned out that he simply did not speak so as to not strain his voice, and was too shy to ask her out. His suit as a space marshal and his team remain unknown.

Teachers
 Principal Kirkpatrick (Sarge): A former commander of a military academy who was brought in to be principal at Galaxy High, whose students are determined to get on his last nerve. He has a jolly personality amid his usual strict demeanor. He is afraid of speaking to large crowds, but has since overcome his fears after reading Yoko's book about overcoming stage fright. Captain Smith is also his longtime buddy; it is unknown whether it's true or not. He is voiced by Patrick Poivey in French version and Brian Dobson in English version.
 Mrs. Schragger: Galaxy High's astronomy teacher. She has unusually accurate senses of hearing and vision, which makes cheating and chatting in her classroom utterly impossible.
 Mr. S (Spzoerscliipw’): The team's favorite teacher, despite his unattractive physical appearance by human standards.
 Mr. Fitch : A fast-talking space cowboy who is head of showing the new equipment for marshals. He is infamous among the students for assigning huge amounts of homework.
 Ms. Roskoff: A Russian ex-cosmonaut who teaches Space Investigation Training. She is the school's most athletic instructor.

UltraPets
On the first day of school at Galaxy High, each student is assigned a pet robot that serves as an aide and companion to them. Although they're cute, if provoked an Ultrapet can transform into a powerful fighting machine and, in the blink of an eye, can immobilize an alien foe upon its master's orders.

 Fluffy: Yoko's ultrapet, a cute robotic weasel (who behaves like a dog) which helps the students throughout their missions. He is capable of transforming into a bipedal attack mode. Bears a strong resemblance to Latias, the female of the Eon Duo from the Pokémon Franchise.
 Spike: Spike is Toby's ultrapet.

Episodes

Technology

Galaxy High

Hornet
The standard issue mission ship for interplanetary travel. Loss of a Hornet while not completing a mission means expulsion from Galaxy High unless it is recovered. The Hornet is armed with two forward missile launchers, two manned turrets and one automated one on the top. It can be flown by one person, though standard issue is three. In the back, the Hornet can carry a Six-by-Six or a cargo container.

Shuttle
Massive aerospace aircraft carrier, owned by Galaxy High. The ship serves as the personal flagship of Director Kirkpatrick. Its main purpose is the transportation of Defenders at a distance exceeding the radius of autonomous flight. For some missions the ship carries "Hornets", which have a much greater range of flight.

Gluefoam
A purple glue-like substance. It is meant to incapacitate a person or patch a planet together. On skin contact, it eventually dissolves.

Defender
Small lightweight craft that are mainly used in the defence of Earth and Galaxy High. Josh, Yoko, and Brett each have one of the three main types of Defender. These craft need shuttles to carry them to its destination.

Each Defender is equipped with a variety of weapons which include hidden laser blasters and varying numbers of missiles.

Credits
source:
 Producers: Vincent Chalvon Demersay and David Michel
 Director: Stephane Berry
 Storyboard Supervisor: Damien Tromel
 Character designer: Eddie Mehong and Fabien Mense
 Mechanical designer : David Cannoville
 Supervision : Eddie Mehong
 Overseas animation studio: Digital eMation
 Ink, Paint and Compositing: ToutenKartoon Canada
 Post Production: ToutenKartoon Canada
 Music :  Paul-Étienne Côté

Music
Title Music: Michael Kulas
OST: David Vadant and Noam Kaniel for Kia Productions
Specific Music: Paul-Étienne Côté for CirconFlex Productions

References

External links
Official Team Galaxy website
YTV Team Galaxy page [Internet Archive, March, 23 2010]
The Unofficial Team Galaxy Website [Internet Archive, July, 12 2013]

2006 Canadian television series debuts
2007 Canadian television series endings
2006 French television series debuts
2007 French television series endings
YTV (Canadian TV channel) original programming
Jetix original programming
Anime-influenced Western animated television series
Television series by Banijay
Television series by Image Entertainment Corporation
2000s Canadian animated television series
2000s French animated television series
Canadian children's animated action television series
Canadian children's animated space adventure television series
Canadian children's animated science fantasy television series
French children's animated action television series
French children's animated space adventure television series
French children's animated science fantasy television series
Canadian computer-animated television series
French computer-animated television series
Animated television series about children
Television series set in the 2050s
Television series set on fictional planets
2000s Canadian high school television series
Teen animated television series
English-language television shows